Remco or Remko is a Dutch masculine given name, traditionally from Groningen. It is related to the West Frisian name Remme, which itself has an unclear, possibly Germanic origin. 

People with the name include:
Remco Boere (born 1961), Dutch footballer
Remco Bosma (born 1971), Dutch VVD politician
Remco te Brake (born 1988), Dutch cyclist
Remco Campert (born 1929), Dutch author, poet and columnist
Remco Dijkstra (born 1972), Dutch VVD politician
Remco Evenepoel, (born 2000), Belgian cyclist
Remco van Eijden (born 1977), Dutch darts player
 (born 1983), Dutch speed skater
Remco Pardoel (born 1969), Dutch mixed martial artist
Remco Pielstroom (born 1965), Dutch water polo player
Remco van der Schaaf (born 1979), Dutch footballer
Remco Torenbosch (born 1982), Dutch visual artist
Remco van Wijk (born 1972), Dutch field hockey player

Remko Bicentini (born 1968), Dutch-Curaçaoan football player and manager
Remko Pasveer (born 1983), Dutch football goalkeeper
Remko Scha (1945–2015), Dutch computer scientist, logician and composer

See also
Remco, American toy company between the 1940s and 1990s, selling among other the  Remco Showboat
RemCo, Remuneration Committee on a board of directors

References

Dutch masculine given names